Selma Ottilia Lovisa Lagerlöf (20 November 1858 – 16 March 1940) was a Swedish author. She published her first novel, Gösta Berling's Saga, at the age of 33. She was the first woman to win the Nobel Prize in Literature, which she was awarded in 1909. Additionally, she was the first woman to be granted a membership in the Swedish Academy in 1914.

Life

Early years

Selma Ottilia Lovisa Lagerlöf was born on 20 November 1858 at Mårbacka, Värmland, Kingdoms of Sweden and Norway. Lagerlöf was the daughter of Erik Gustaf Lagerlöf, a lieutenant in the Royal Värmland Regiment, and Louise Lagerlöf (née Wallroth), whose father was a well-to-do merchant and a foundry owner. Lagerlöf was the couple's fifth child out of six. She was born with a hip injury, which was caused by detachment in the hip joint. At the age of three and a half, a sickness left her lame in both legs, although she later recovered.

She was a quiet, serious child with a deep love of reading. She wrote poetry but did not publish anything until later in life. Her grandmother helped raise her, often telling stories of fairytales and fantasy. Growing up, she was plain and slightly lame, and an account stated that the cross-country wanderings of Margarethe and Elisabet in Gösta Berling's Saga could be the author's compensatory fantasies. She received her schooling at home since the Folkskola compulsory education system was not fully developed yet. She studied English and French. After reading Osceola by Thomas Mayne Reid at the age of seven, she decided she would be a writer when she grew up.

In 1868, at the age of 10, Selma began reading the Bible. At this time her father was very ill, and she hoped that God would heal him if she read the Bible from cover to cover. Her father lived for another 17 years. In this manner, Lagerlöf became accustomed to the language of Scripture.

Selma's father is said to have been an alcoholic, something she rarely discussed. Her father did not want Selma to continue her education or remain involved with the women's movement. Later in life, she would buy back her father's estate with the money she received for her Nobel Prize. Lagerlöf lived there for the rest of her life. She also completed her studies at the Royal Seminary to become a teacher the same year as her father died.

In her early life she supposedly was on very good terms with Lovisa Larsson.

Teaching life
Lagerlöf studied at the Högre lärarinneseminariet in Stockholm from 1882 to 1885. She worked as a country schoolteacher at a high school for girls in Landskrona from 1885 to 1895, while honing her story-telling skills, with particular focus on the legends she had learned as a child. She liked the teaching profession and appreciated her students. She had a talent for capturing the children's attention through telling them stories about the different countries about which they were studying or stories about Jesus and his disciples. During this period of her life, Selma lived with her aunt Lovisa Lagerlöf.

Through her studies at the Royal Women's Superior Training Academy in Stockholm, Lagerlöf reacted against the realism of contemporary Swedish-language writers such as August Strindberg. She began her first novel, Gösta Berling's Saga, while working as a teacher in Landskrona. Her first break as a writer came when she submitted the first chapters to a literary contest in the magazine Idun, and won a publishing contract for the whole book. At first, her writing only received mild reviews from critics. Once a popular male critic, Georg Brandes, gave her positive reviews of the Danish translation, her popularity soared. She received financial support of Fredrika Limnell, who wished to enable her to concentrate on her writing.

Literary career
A visit in 1900 to the American Colony in Jerusalem became the inspiration for Lagerlöf's book by that name. The royal family and the Swedish Academy gave her substantial financial support to continue her passion. Jerusalem was also acclaimed by critics, who began comparing her to Homer and Shakespeare, so that she became a popular figure both in Sweden and abroad. By 1895, she gave up her teaching to devote herself to her writing. With the help of proceeds from Gösta Berling's Saga and a scholarship and grant, she made two journeys, which were largely instrumental in providing material for her next novel. With her close friend Sophie Elkan, she traveled to Italy, and she also traveled to Palestine and other parts of the East. In Italy, a legend of a Christ Child figure that had been replaced with a false version inspired Lagerlöf's novel  (The Miracles of the Antichrist). Set in Sicily, the novel explores the interplay between Christian and socialist moral systems. However, most of Lagerlöf's stories were set in Värmland.

In 1902, Lagerlöf was asked by the National Teachers' Association to write a geography book for children. She wrote  (The Wonderful Adventures of Nils), a novel about a boy from the southernmost part of Sweden, who had been shrunk to the size of a thumb and who travelled on the back of a goose across the country. Lagerlöf mixed historical and geographical facts about the provinces of Sweden with the tale of the boy's adventures until he managed to return home and was restored to his normal size. The novel is one of Lagerlöf's most well-known books, and it has been translated into more than 30 languages.

She moved in 1897 to Falun, and met Valborg Olander, who became her literary assistant and friend, but Elkan's jealousy of Olander was a complication in the relationship. Olander, a teacher, was also active in the growing women's suffrage movement in Sweden. Selma Lagerlöf herself was active as a speaker for the National Association for Women's Suffrage, which was beneficial for the organisation because of the great respect which surrounded Lagerlöf, and she spoke at the International Suffrage Congress in Stockholm in June 1911, where she gave the opening address, as well as at the victory party of the Swedish suffrage movement after women suffrage had been granted in May 1919.

Selma Lagerlöf was a friend of the German-Jewish writer Nelly Sachs. Shortly before her death in 1940, Lagerlöf intervened with the Swedish royal family to secure the release of Sachs and Sachs' aged mother from Nazi Germany, on the last flight from Germany to Sweden, and their lifelong asylum in Stockholm.

Personal life

Relationships

In 1894, she met the Swedish writer Sophie Elkan, who became her friend and companion. Over many years, Elkan and Lagerlöf critiqued each other's work. Lagerlöf wrote that Elkan strongly influenced her work and that she often disagreed sharply with the direction Lagerlöf wanted to take in her books. Selma's letters to Sophie were published in 1993, titled  ('You Teach me to be Free'). There appears to have been a strong rivalry between Elkan and Olander while both lived (Elkan died approximately twenty years before the other two women). Both relationships were close, emotional, exclusive and described in terms suggestive of love, the boundary between expressions of friendship and love being somewhat vague at the time. Still, it is primarily the surviving correspondence with Olander that contains passages implying decidedly erotic and physical passion, even though Lagerlöf took care to destroy many of the letters she found too risky. Homosexual relations between women were taboo as well as illegal in Sweden at the time, so none of the women involved ever revealed such a thing publicly.

Literary adaptations

In 1919, Lagerlöf sold all the movie rights to all of her as-yet unpublished works to Swedish Cinema Theatre, so over the years, many movie versions of her works were made. During the era of Swedish silent cinema, her works were used in film by Victor Sjöström, Mauritz Stiller, and other Swedish film makers. Sjöström's retelling of Lagerlöf's tales about rural Swedish life, in which his camera recorded the detail of traditional village life and the Swedish landscape, provided the basis of some of the most poetic and memorable products of silent cinema. Jerusalem was adapted in 1996 into the internationally acclaimed film Jerusalem.

Awards and commemoration

On 10 December 1909, Selma Lagerlöf won the Nobel Prize "in appreciation of the lofty idealism, vivid imagination, and spiritual perception that characterize her writings", but the decision was preceded by harsh internal power struggle within the Swedish Academy, the body that awards the Nobel Prize in literature. During her acceptance speech, she remained humble and told a fantastic story of her father, as she 'visited him in heaven'. In the story, she asks her father for help with the debt she owes and her father explains the debt is from all the people who supported her throughout her career. In 1904, the academy had awarded her its great gold medal, and in 1914, she also became a member of the academy. For both the academy membership and her Nobel literature prize, she was the first woman to be so honored. She was awarded the Litteris et Artibus in 1909 and the Illis quorum in 1926. In 1991, she became the first woman to be depicted on a Swedish banknote, when the first 20-kronor note was released.

In 1907, she received the honorary degree of doctor of letters (filosofie hedersdoktor) from Uppsala University. In 1928, she received an honorary doctorate from the University of Greifswald's Faculty of Arts. At the start of World War II, she sent her Nobel Prize medal and gold medal from the Swedish Academy to the government of Finland to help raise money to fight the Soviet Union. The Finnish government was so touched that it raised the necessary money by other means and returned her medal to her.

Two hotels are named after her in Östra Ämtervik in Sunne, and her home, is preserved as a museum.

Published works
Original Swedish-language publications are listed primarily.

The popularity of Lagerlöf in the United States was due in part to Velma Swanston Howard, or V. S. Howard (1868–1937, a suffragette and Christian scientist) – who was an early believer in her appeal to Americans and who carefully translated many of her books.

  (1891; novel). Translated as The Story of Gösta Berling (Pauline Bancroft Flach, 1898), Gösta Berling's Saga (V.S. Howard and Lillie Tudeer, 1898), The Story of Gösta Berling (R. Bly, 1962)
  (1894; short stories). Translated as Invisible Links (Pauline Bancroft Flach, (1869–1966) 1899)
  (1897; novel). Translated as The Miracles of Antichrist (Selma Ahlström Trotz, 1899) and The Miracles of Antichrist (Pauline Bancroft Flach (1869–1966), 1899)
  (1899; short stories). Translated as The Queens of Kungahälla and Other Sketches From a Swedish Homestead (Jessie Bröchner, 1901; C. Field, 1917)
  (1899; short stories). Translated as The Tale of a Manor and Other Sketches (C. Field, 1922)
  (1901; novel). Translated as Jerusalem (Jessie Bröchner, 1903; V.S. Howard, 1914)
  (1902; novel). Translated as The Holy City : Jerusalem II (V.S. Howard, 1918)
  (1903; novel). Translated as Herr Arne's Hoard (Arthur G. Chater, 1923; Philip Brakenridge, 1952) and The Treasure (Arthur G. Chater, 1925) – adapted as the 1919 film Sir Arne's Treasure.
  (1904; short stories). Translated as Christ Legends and Other Stories (V,S. Howard, 1908)
  (1906–07; novel). Translated as The Wonderful Adventures of Nils (V.S. Howard, 1907; Richard E. Oldenburg, 1967) and Further Adventures of Nils (V.S. Howard, 1911)
  (1908; short stories). Translated as The Girl from the Marsh Croft (V.S. Howard, 1910) and Girl from the Marsh Croft and Other Stories (edited by Greta Anderson, 1996)
  (1911; non-fiction). Translated as Home and State: Being an Address Delivered at Stockholm at the Sixth Convention of the International Woman Suffrage Alliance, June 1911 (C. Ursula Holmstedt, 1912)
  (1911; novel). Translated as Liliecrona's Home (Anna Barwell, 1913)
 Körkarlen (1912; novel). Translated as Thy Soul Shall Bear Witness! (William Frederick Harvey, 1921). Filmed as The Phantom Carriage, The Phantom Chariot, The Stroke of Midnight.
  (1913) with Bernt Fredgren
  (1914; short stories)
  (1914; novel). Translated as The Emperor of Portugallia (V.S. Howard, 1916)
  (1914; play)
  (1915; short stories)
  (1915, 1921; novel). Translated as The Changeling (Lagerlöf novel) (Susanna Stevens, 1992)
  (1918; novel). Translated as The Outcast (Lagerlöf novel) (W. Worster, 1920/22)
  (1918; novel), with illustrations by Einar Nerman
  (1920; non-fiction), biography of Zachris Topelius
  (1922; memoir). Translated as Marbacka: The Story of a Manor (V.S. Howard, 1924) and Memories of Marbacka (Greta Andersen, 1996) – named for the estate Mårbacka where Lagerlöf was born and raised
The Ring trilogy – published in 1931 as The Ring of the Löwenskölds, containing the Martin and Howard translations, 
 Löwensköldska ringen (1925; novel). Translated as The General's Ring (Francesca Martin, 1928) and as The Löwensköld Ring (Linda Schenck, 1991)
 Charlotte Löwensköld (1925; novel). Translated as Charlotte Löwensköld (V.S. Howard)
 Anna Svärd (1928; novel). Translated as Anna Svärd (V.S. Howard, 1931)
  (1929; play), based on 1899 work 
  (1930; short stories)
  (1930; memoir). Translated as Memories of My Childhood (Lagerlöf) Further Years at Mårbacka (V.S. Howard, 1934)
  (1932; memoir). Translated as The Diary of Selma Lagerlöf (V.S. Howard, 1936)
  (1933; short stories). Translated as Harvest (book) (Florence and Naboth Hedin, 1935)
  (1936)
  (1936)
  (1943–45)
  (1959)
  (1984)

Works about Selma Lagerlöf
Berendsohn, Walter A., Selma Lagerlöf: Her Life and Work (adapted from the German by George F. Timpson) – London : Nicholson & Watson, 1931
Wägner, Elin, Selma Lagerlöf I (1942) and Selma Lagerlöf II (1943)
Vrieze, Folkerdina Stientje de, Fact and Fiction in the Autobiographical Works of Selma Lagerlof – Assen, Netherlands : Van Gorcum, 1958
Nelson, Anne Theodora, The Critical Reception of Selma Lagerlöf in France – Evanston, Ill., 1962
Victor Folke Nelson, The Mårbacka Edition of the Works of Selma Lagerlöf in The Saturday Review of Literature, 1929.
Olson-Buckner, Elsa, The epic tradition in Gösta Berlings saga – Brooklyn, N.Y. : Theodore Gaus, 1978
Edström, Vivi, Selma Lagerlöf (trans. by Barbara Lide) – Boston : Twayne Publishers, 1984
Madler, Jennifer Lynn, The Literary Response of German-language Authors to Selma Lagerlöf – Urbana, Ill. : University of Illinois, 1998
De Noma, Elizabeth Ann, Multiple Melodrama: the Making and Remaking of Three Selma Lagerlöf Narratives in the Silent Era and the 1940s – Ann Arbor, Mich. : UMI Research Press, cop. 2000
Watson, Jennifer, Swedish Novelist Selma Lagerlöf, 1858–1940, and Germany at the Turn of the Century: O du Stern ob meinem Garten – Lewiston, NY : Edwin Mellen Press, 2004

See also
 List of female Nobel laureates

References

Further reading

External links

portrait in old age

Resources
 
 List of Works
 
 The background to the writing of The Wonderful Adventures of Nils

Works online
 
 
 
 
 
 Works by Selma Lagerlöf at Project Runeberg 
 Works by Selma Lagerlöf at Swedish Literature Bank 

 
1858 births
1940 deaths
People from Sunne Municipality
Writers from Värmland
Swedish women novelists
Swedish-language writers
19th-century Swedish novelists
Nobel laureates in Literature
Members of the Swedish Academy
Swedish Christian pacifists
Christian writers
Swedish feminists
Swedish suffragists
Liberals (Sweden) politicians
Swedish Lutherans
Swedish Nobel laureates
Swedish LGBT novelists
LGBT Lutherans
LGBT Nobel laureates
Women Nobel laureates
Swedish children's writers
Swedish women children's writers
20th-century Swedish novelists
Swedish short story writers
Recipients of the Illis quorum
Litteris et Artibus recipients